Gymnocalycium pflanzii is a species of Gymnocalycium from Bolivia and Paraguay.

References

External links
 
 

pflanzii
Flora of Bolivia
Flora of Paraguay